Mickey's Gala Premier is a Walt Disney cartoon produced in 1933, directed by Burt Gillett, and featuring parodies of several famous Hollywood film actors from the 1930s. It was the 58th Mickey Mouse short film, and the eighth of that year.

Some sources claim this cartoon is called "Mickey's Gala Premiere". However "Premier" can be clearly read from the title card.

Plot
A new Mickey Mouse cartoon will have its premiere in the Grauman's Chinese Theatre in Hollywood. Several Hollywood celebrities all arrive in limousines to attend this special event. Outside The Keystone Cops (Ben Turpin, Ford Sterling, Mack Swain, Harry Langdon and Chester Conklin) are guarding the traffic.

Wallace Beery, Marie Dressler, Lionel Barrymore, John Barrymore and Ethel Barrymore step out of the first limousine, all costumed as in the film Rasputin and the Empress (1932). Then Laurel and Hardy leave the car and close the door behind them. Inside The Marx Brothers all stick their heads out of the car window.

In the next scene Maurice Chevalier, Eddie Cantor costumed as in the film The Kid from Spain, and Jimmy Durante take turns singing in front of a microphone. They are followed by Jean Harlow, Joan Crawford costumed as in the film Rain and Janet Gaynor all singing new lyrics to the chant. Finally Harold Lloyd, Clark Gable, Edward G. Robinson, and Adolphe Menjou join in to conclude the song.

Sid Grauman is saluting all the guests. George Arliss and Joe E. Brown simply enter, but Charlie Chaplin sneaks inside. Then Buster Keaton enters the building, followed by The Marx Brothers all hidden under Groucho Marx' coat. Mae West enters, costumed as in the film She Done Him Wrong, and utters her famous line, "Why don't you come up sometime and see me?", which shocks and embarrasses Grauman.

Then Mickey Mouse, Minnie Mouse, Pluto, Horace Horsecollar, and Clarabelle Cow arrive in a limousine and are cheered by the audience. Once inside the theatre Mickey’s new cartoon, Gallopin' Romance, premieres. The plot revolves around Mickey and Minnie playing music together, when suddenly Pegleg Pete kidnaps Minnie and drives off on a horse (Horace Horsecollar). Mickey chases him and beats Pete in the end, bringing Minnie to safety.

All the guests in the theatre move rhythmically to the music. We can see Helen Hayes, William Powell, Chester Morris, Gloria Swanson, and George Arliss in the audience. In the next close-up scenes the viewer can identify Jimmy Durante, Wallace Beery, Marie Dressler, Rudy Vallee, Eddie Cantor, Joan Crawford, Will H. Hays (dressed as a king in reference to his position as “Censorship Czar”) and Myrna Loy. Ed Wynn, Wheeler & Woolsey, Laurel & Hardy all laugh with the cartoon. Bela Lugosi (dressed as Count Dracula), Fredric March (dressed as Mr. Hyde) and Boris Karloff (dressed as Frankenstein's monster) do the same, but with spooky evil laughter. Joe E. Brown laughs so loud that his enormous mouth opens wide, while Buster Keaton keeps his poker face. Jimmy Durante and Douglas Fairbanks laugh so loud that they literally "roll in the aisles". They are joined in by Groucho Marx, Joe E. Brown, Charlie Chaplin, Harold Lloyd and Laurel and Hardy. As the cartoon ends, the whole audience applauds and congratulates Mickey with his success. But Mickey is so shy that he has to be pulled on the stage by Will Rogers with a rope. All the Hollywood actors now shake Mickey’s hands, and humorously, his feet, to congratulate him with his success. Then Greta Garbo, no longer wanting to be alone, walks onto the stage and starts covering Mickey’s face with kisses. Mickey then wakes up in his bed, while Pluto is licking his face. Mickey wonders if he was dreaming, and then the scene irises out.

Other Hollywood celebrities that can be spotted in the crowd scenes: Constance Bennett, Warner Baxter, and Walt Disney (as the fourth person on the right, in the scene where the other actors shy away because Garbo enters the stage).

Production notes
 The cartoon seen in the film, Gallopin’ Romance, was made exclusively for Mickey’s Gala Premier. No separate Mickey Mouse cartoon features this title.
 Ed Wynn would later play The Mad Hatter in the 1951 film Alice in Wonderland and Uncle Albert in Mary Poppins. Maurice Chevalier would later play Father Sylvain in Monkeys, Go Home! and sing the theme song of The Aristocats. Both would go on to be named a Disney Legend, an award given to those who have made an outstanding contribution to The Walt Disney Company.
Adolphe Menjou would make his last film performance in the 1960 film Pollyanna.
 Helen Hayes would later play Grandma Steinmetz in Herbie Rides Again.
 This was the first time Mickey was depicted interacting with humans.
At this point in time, the Mickey shorts were released through United Artists, but the only currently existing prints of this short are reissue prints that omit any mention of UA. However, the "titles" for the short-within-a-short Gallopin’ Romance shows the UA credits, giving a modern-day viewer an idea on how a Mickey Mouse cartoon opening might have looked like in the UA era.

Temporary shutdown of BBC Television Service 
On 1 September 1939, Mickey’s Gala Premier was the final programme broadcast by the BBC Television Service (today known as BBC One) before it ceased broadcasting during World War II. An urban legend about this final broadcast claims that due to the sudden outbreak of the war the BBC cut the transmission mid-program, and when BBC-TV resumed after the conflict, it was picked up at the very point it had been interrupted.

Despite this widespread belief, the cartoon was shown in its entirety and then followed by tuning signals. On 7 June 1946, the day BBC television broadcasts resumed after the war, Mickey’s Gala Premier was shown again.

Voice cast
 Mickey Mouse: Walt Disney
 Minnie Mouse: Marcellite Garner
 Pluto: Pinto Colvig
 Pete: Billy Bletcher
 Celebrities: Jerry Lester

Home media
The short was released on December 2, 2002 on Walt Disney Treasures: Mickey Mouse in Black and White.

See also
 Mickey's Polo Team
 Mother Goose Goes Hollywood
 Hollywood Steps Out
 Hollywood Daffy
 The Autograph Hound
 Slick Hare
 What's Cookin' Doc?
 Felix in Hollywood
Mickey Mouse (film series)

References

External links

Disney Shorts

1933 films
1933 animated films
1930s color films
American black-and-white films
Films about Hollywood, Los Angeles
1930s Disney animated short films
Mickey Mouse short films
Films about actors
Films set in Los Angeles
Films directed by Burt Gillett
Films produced by Walt Disney
Animation based on real people
Cultural depictions of actors
Cultural depictions of Charlie Chaplin
Cultural depictions of Buster Keaton
Cultural depictions of Laurel & Hardy
Cultural depictions of the Marx Brothers
Cultural depictions of Mae West
Cultural depictions of Greta Garbo
Cultural depictions of Clark Gable
Cultural depictions of Edward G. Robinson
Cultural depictions of Walt Disney
Cultural depictions of Jimmy Durante
Cultural depictions of Maurice Chevalier
Cultural depictions of Will Rogers
Cultural depictions of Bela Lugosi
Films scored by Frank Churchill
1930s American films